Luke Temple, also known under the alias Art Feynman, is an American singer-songwriter.  He records under his own name and with New York-based band Here We Go Magic.

Temple was born in Salem, Massachusetts. After spending time in Northern California, he studied painting at Boston's Museum of Fine Arts. After struggling to make a living as a visual artist, including painting murals in upscale New York City apartments, Temple moved into songwriting and recording. After recording a four song EP himself on a four-track recorder, Temple was signed to Mill Pond Records of Seattle.
He would go on to record two full-length albums with Mill Pond, Hold a Match for a Gasoline World (2005) and Snow Beast (2007), before signing with label Secretly Canadian in 2010 for Good Mood Fool. On November 11, 2016, Temple released A Hand Through the Cellar Door.

Temple's vocal styles are noted for their use of falsetto, and have been compared to Paul Simon, Jeff Buckley, and Nick Drake.

His song "Make Right With You" was featured in an episode of Grey's Anatomy, season 3's "Where the Boys Are".

Temple also began releasing music under the alias Art Feynman in 2017, beginning with Blast Off Through the Wicker released on the Western Vinyl label.

Discography

Luke Temple

Studio albums
 2005 – Hold a Match for a Gasoline World (Mill Pond)
 2007 – Snowbeast (Mill Pond)
 2011 – Don't Act Like You Don't Care (Western Vinyl)
 2013 – Good Mood Fool (Secretly Canadian)
 2016 – A Hand Through the Cellar Door (Secretly Canadian)
 2019 – Both-And (Native Cat Recordings)

Extended plays
 2004 – Luke Temple (Mill Pond)

Art Feynman

Studio albums
 2017 – Blast Off Through the Wicker (Western Vinyl)
 2020 – Half Price at 3:30 (Western Vinyl)

Extended plays
 2017 – Near Negative (Western Vinyl)

References

External links
Official Page on Mill Pond Records
Lazy-i Interview: March 2005

American singer-songwriters
Living people
Year of birth missing (living people)
Western Vinyl artists
Secretly Canadian artists